The 2012 IIHF World Championship Division II was an international Ice hockey tournaments run by the International Ice Hockey Federation. Group A was contested in Reykjavík, Iceland from April 12–18, 2012 and Group B was contested in Sofia, Bulgaria from April 2–8, 2012.

Participants

Group A

Group B

Group A Tournament

Standings

All times are local (UTC±0).

Statistics

Top 10 scorers

IIHF.com

Goaltending leaders
(minimum 40% team's total ice time)

IIHF.com

Tournament awards
 Best players selected by the directorate:
 Best Goaltender:  Ander Alcaine
Best Defenceman:  Kenny MacAulay
IIHF.com

Group B Tournament

Standings

All times are local (UTC+3).

Statistics

Top 10 scorers

IIHF.com

Goaltending leaders
(minimum 40% team's total ice time)

IIHF.com

Tournament awards
 Best players selected by the directorate:
 Best Goaltender:  Bjorn Steijlen
Best Defenceman:  Niki de Herdt
Best Forward:  Stanislav Muhachev
IIHF.com

References

External links
Group A
Group B

IIHF World Championship Division II
3
World
International ice hockey competitions hosted by Bulgaria
2012
World
April 2012 sports events in Europe
Sports competitions in Sofia
Sports competitions in Reykjavík
2010s in Reykjavík
2010s in Sofia